Pamigua (sometimes called Pamiwa) is an extinct language of Colombia, related to Tinigua. It was spoken at the mission of San Concepción de Arauca in Colombia.

References

Tiniguan languages
Extinct languages of South America